Pleskow is a surname. Notable people with the surname include:

 Eric Pleskow (1924–2019), Austrian-born American film producer
 Raoul Pleskow (1930–2022), Austrian-born American composer